The Blow-Up is a live album by the American band Television, released as The Blow Up on cassette in 1982. It was reissued in 1990 and again in 1999. The songs first appeared on a bootleg titled Arrow.

Production
Recorded at CBGB in 1978, the album was released four years after the band broke up. It contains covers of "Knockin' on Heaven's Door" and "Satisfaction". ROIR allegedly acquired the recording from the fan who had bootlegged the band's shows; The Blow-Up'''s sound quality is typical of a bootlegged recording. "Little Johnny Jewel" had previously only been issued as a single.

Critical reception

Robert Christgau, who cowrote the liner notes, stated that, "as with so many ROIR cassettes (and commercial tapes in general), audio makes the difference between a laudable document and living history," and called the version of "Little Johnny Jewel" "definitive." The New York Times praised the "lyrical, incendiary" renditions.

AllMusic wrote that the album "comes awfully close to being an essential document, simply because the band's studio albums didn't always capture the rawness and spontaneity that fueled their on-stage improvisations." In 1990, The Philadelphia Inquirer determined that The Blow-Up "captures the heady intensity of the best guitar band to come out of New York's late-'70s punk/new-wave scene." The Vancouver Sun admired the "breathtaking dual guitar interplay." Spin'' listed the 1999 reissue as one of the five best of 1999, deeming "Little Johnny Jewel" "the height of love between man and E-string."

Track listing

References

Television (band) albums
1982 live albums
ROIR live albums